The Flock was an American, Chicago-based jazz rock band, that released two albums on Columbia Records in 1969 (The Flock) and 1970 (Dinosaur Swamps).  The Flock did not achieve the commercial success of other Columbia jazz-rock groups of the era such as Chicago and Blood Sweat & Tears, but were recognized for featuring a violin prominently in their recordings.  The violinist, Jerry Goodman, went on to become a member of Mahavishnu Orchestra and a solo artist.

History

The Flock had three early singles on Destination Records and one on USA Records, local Chicago labels, recorded between 1966 and 1968. Goodman, the violinist, was not in this line-up but worked as a roadie with the band. All four singles, "Can't You See", "Are You The Kind", "Take Me Back" and "What Would You Do If The Sun Died?" are available on CD.  The members at the time of their 1969 album recording were Fred Glickstein (guitar, lead vocals), Jerry Goodman (violin), Jerry Smith (bass), Ron Karpman (drums), Rick Canoff (saxophone), Tom (T.S. Henry) Webb (saxophone) and Frank Posa (trumpet).

The promising first album was further into jazz fusion than either Chicago or Blood Sweat & Tears, influenced by the Miles Davis' Bitches Brew album in which Webb participated, but whose performance was not recorded.  The first album was produced by John McClure, better known for his work with classical and jazz artists, with liner notes written from the audience at Whisky a Go Go by John Mayall, on July 9, 1969.  The band went back into the studio and recorded a second album entitled Dinosaur Swamps, (with Jon Gerber replacing Tom Webb) featuring the hit, "Big Bird."  They began work on a third studio album, provisionally titled Flock Rock, but rumours at the time had Columbia Records' Clive Davis raiding The Flock and recruiting Goodman for the Mahavishnu Orchestra project.  Glickstein's remembrance of the event was, according to the sleevenotes with The Flock compilation CD Truth, slightly more matter-of-fact:  "In reality the band members started going in different musical directions. You know. That old song."

The Flock reunited briefly in 1975 for an album, Inside Out, and in 2004 a CD was released of a 1973 live concert called, Live in Europe, which features Michael Zydowsky on violin in place of Goodman and includes original members Fred Glickstein, Jerry Smith, and Ron Karpman.

In late 1976, Fred Glickstein and Ron Karpman recruited bassist/cellist Thom Blecka and formed a power trio called FLOCK 3. The new outfit played some older Flock compositions but emphasized new material co-written by Glickstein and Karpman, with some arrangements contributed by Blecka. The rock-oriented fusion trio played a few local gigs opening for Cheap Trick and The Cryan' Shames. They were occasionally joined onstage by Flock alumnus T.S. Henry Webb (saxophone/vocals) and also friends Dennis Tiger (blues harp/vocals) and Jeff Gates (keyboards). The band's live performances were never captured on tape and studio recording attempts fell by the wayside, due to personnel conflicts.

There is film footage of the big-band version of the Flock (the Dinosaur Swamps version of the group) playing the song "Big Bird (Fly)" on the 1971 Dutch documentary Stamping Ground.  Goodman is prominently featured in the video among members of the group.

Discography
 The Flock (1969)
 Dinosaur Swamps (1970)
 Inside Out (1975)
 Live in Europe (2004)
 Flock Rock – The Best of The Flock (2008)
 2131 South Michigan Ave (2009)
 Heaven Bound: The Lost Album (recorded 1977) (2014)

References

External links
[ Allmusic]
Myspace.com

Rock music groups from Illinois
Musical groups from Chicago